Châtel-Guyon is a commune in the Puy-de-Dôme department in Auvergne-Rhône-Alpes in central France.

Prior to June 2008 it was known as Châtelguyon.

First World War
At the time of the First World War, the population was approximately 2000 residents. It was an international destination for its baths and healing springs and attracted 30,000 visitors each summer. With the onset of war the majority of the hotels were closed. Many were used by the French government for housing French and Belgian refugees, as well as for hospitals by French and other forces. The American Expeditionary Force established Base Hospital No. 20 at Châtel-Guyon in May 1918. The hospital ceased operations in January 1919.

Population

See also
Communes of the Puy-de-Dôme department

References

Citations

Sources

Communes of Puy-de-Dôme